Jiading is a suburban district of Shanghai. It had a population of 1,471,100 in 2010.

History
Historically, Jiading was a separate municipality/town, until, in 1958, becoming under the administration of Shanghai. In 1993, Jiading's designated was changed from a county to a district of Shanghai.

In the early Qing dynasty, which overlapped with Southern Ming, the municipality was infamously known for the "Jiading Massacre", a mass murder carried out by the invading Qing force, led by defected northern Chinese bandit general . In late Qing (in 1853), Jiading city was also known for bandit activities that once captured the city and then Shanghai, as a rebellion of taxation.

In 2005, the Jiading district government invested RMB 10 million to build the Shanghai Museum of the Imperial Examination System.

Geography
Jiading district is located in the northwestern part of Shanghai. It stretches across .

Climate

Jiading has a humid subtropical climate (Köppen climate classification Cfa).

Administration
Jiading District administers several subdistricts towns, including Jiading, Anting, Nanxiang, Huating, Xuhang, Waigang, Huangdu, Malu and Jiangqiao.

Subdistricts and towns

Landmarks

Shanghai University has a campus in downtown Jiading, which is where SILC is based.

The Shanghai International Circuit is located in Jiading. Each year in April, the Shanghai International Circuit holds the Chinese Grand Prix.

Jiading Confucian Temple
Location: 183 Jiading Nan Dajie, near Tacheng Lu, Jiading District, Shanghai

The Jiading Confucian Temple is one of the best conserved Confucian temples in China. It has gone through several repairs in the past 800 years. It is a national cultural and security unit. The temple was first built in year 1219. In year 1249, a pond and three memorial gates were add to the construction and were still seen today. In front of the main gate which opens towards the Da Cheng Hall (大成殿) stands a 688-year-old juniper tree. Throughout the temple, numerous 700-year-old stone tablets stood against the wall, carved with calligraphy and documentation of historical events. Although the existing buildings are only six or seven out of ten, it is still one of the more complete Confucian Temples in China.

There is also a museum of imperial examinations. The rooms surrounding the Da Cheng Hall have been transformed into a museum about the Imperial Examination, where you could read all about its inexhaustible significance since its foundation about 1,300 years ago.

Fahua Pagoda
Location: No.349 Nanda Street, Jiading District, Shanghai

The ancient pagoda -called Jin Sha Pagoda(金沙塔) when it was built in 1205~1207- had been built before Jiading County was established. There is only a pagoda, no temple. According to the legend, the intention to build the pagoda was only to encourage the local intellectuals to study hard. It has a common name called "Wenbi Peak", which means to pray for the imperial examination. It was renamed to Fahua Pagoda in Ming Dynasty(明朝) by a famous Calligrapher. Presently, there are also the Memorial of Gu Weijun and the Memorial of Hu Juewen in the pagoda courtyard, the visitors can know the life stories of these two famous figures from Jiading.

In its long history, it was damaged and rebuilt quite a few times. During one of its reconstructions in 1608, the local officials funded a lot and the pagoda became a lot more beautiful. "Jin Sha Under Sunset"(金沙夕照) had been a famous attraction of Jia Ding Town for a long long time. The latest renovation was in 1996.

The pagoda is surrounded by Zhouqiao Old Street  during the renovation in 1996 lots of efforts were put into restoring the buildings around it to what they looked hundreds of years ago.

Bamboo Carving Museum
Location：No.321 South Street, Jiading District, Shanghai

The Bamboo Carving Museum, covering bamboo carving over the past 400 years since the mid-Ming Dynasty. It exhibits its collections and fine modern Jiading bamboo carvings. Bamboo carvings collected by other collection organizations and collectors are also exhibited from time to time. In the middle and late Ming Dynasty, Zhu He, his son and grandson initiated Jiading bamboo carving in the form of deep relief and penetrating carving, which is one of the best art products with rich cultural connotation and regional characteristics in Jiading.

Sports
Shanghai Jiading F.C. is the district's local soccer club.

Accommodation
There are numerous international hotels within the Jiading district.
Among the most famous are Sheraton Shanghai Jiading Hotel and the Crowne Plaza Shanghai Anting, the latter one being the first five star international hotel in Jiading.

Notable people 
 Yang Yongliang (b. 1980), artist
 James S.C. Chao (b. ~1935), merchant mariner, business leader, and philanthropist. He is the founder of Foremost Group.
 Wellington Koo (b. ~1888), a Chinese statesman of the Republic of China.

Transportation

Highways
Jiading district is connected to downtown Shanghai by the Hujia Expressway, the first expressway in China. Jiading district is near Shanghai's Hongqiao Airport, but across town from Pudong International Airport.

Metro
Jiading is currently served by two metro lines operated by Shanghai Metro:
 - Nanxiang, Malu, Jiading Xincheng, Baiyin Road, West Jiading, North Jiading / Shanghai Circuit, East Changji Road, Shanghai Automobile City, Anting
 - Jinyun Road, West Jinshajiang Road, Fengzhuang
 - Fengbang, Lexiu Road, Lintao Road, Jiayi Road, Dingbian Road, Zhenxin Xincun

References

Further reading
 
 James S.C. Chao

External links

 Jiading Government portal
 Crowne Plaza Shanghai Anting Golf

Districts of Shanghai